Cenizo can refer to:

 Leucophyllum frutescens, plant sometimes called cenizo
 Blue Java banana, a banana cultivar sometimes called cenizo in Central America
 El Cenizo, Texas, town in Texas